Adrienne Jo Barbeau (born June 11, 1945) is an American actress, singer, and author of three books. She came to prominence in the 1970s as Broadway's original Rizzo in the musical Grease, and as Carol Traynor, the divorced daughter of Maude Findlay (played by Bea Arthur) on the sitcom Maude (1972–1978). In 1980, she began appearing in horror and science fiction films, including The Fog (1980), Escape from New York (1981), Creepshow (1982), and Swamp Thing (1982). During the 1990s, she became known for providing the voice of Catwoman on Batman: The Animated Series (1992–1995), and subsequent animated series. In the 2000s, she appeared on the HBO series Carnivàle (2003–2005) as Ruthie.

Early life
Barbeau was born on June 11, 1945, in Sacramento, California, the daughter of Armene (née Nalbandian) and Joseph Barbeau, who was a public relations executive for Mobil Oil. Her mother was of Armenian descent and her father's ancestry was French Canadian, Irish, and German. She has a sister, Jocelyn, and a half brother on her father's side, Robert Barbeau, who still resides in the Sacramento area. She attended Del Mar High School in San Jose, California. In her autobiography, Barbeau says that she first caught the show business bug while entertaining troops at army bases throughout Southeast Asia, touring with the San Jose Civic Light Opera.

Career

1960s–1989
In the late 1960s, Barbeau moved to New York City and worked "for the mob" as a go-go dancer. She made her Broadway debut in the chorus of Fiddler on the Roof, and later took the role of Hodel, Tevye's daughter; Bette Midler played her character's sister Tzeitel. She left Fiddler in 1971 to play the leading role of Cookie Kovac in the off-Broadway nudie musical Stag Movie. Barbeau, as Cookie Kovac, and Brad Sullivan, as Rip Cord, were "quite jolly and deserve to be congratulated on the lack of embarrassment they show when, on occasion, they have to wander around stark naked. They may not be sexy but they certainly keep cheerful," wrote The New York Times theater critic Clive Barnes in an otherwise negative review. Barbeau went on to star in more than 25 musicals and plays, including Women Behind Bars, The Best Little Whorehouse in Texas, and Grease. She received a Theater World Award and a 1972 Tony Award nomination for her portrayal of tough-girl Rizzo in Grease.

During the 1970s, Barbeau starred as Carol Traynor, the daughter of Bea Arthur's title character, on the comedy series Maude, which ran from 1972 to 1978 (actress Marcia Rodd had originated the role of Carol in a 1972 episode of All in the Family, also titled "Maude," alongside Arthur). In her autobiography, There Are Worse Things I Could Do, Barbeau remarked: "What I didn't know is that when I said [my lines] I was usually walking down a flight of stairs and no one was even listening to me. They were just watching my breasts precede me." During the last season of Maude, Barbeau did not appear in the majority of the episodes. In a 2009 Entertainment Tonight TV interview, Barbeau mentioned that she had good on- and off-camera chemistry with Arthur; she said that the two stayed close until Arthur's death on April 25, 2009. Barbeau and Arthur reunited on camera during a 2007 taping of The View, reminiscing about their long-running friendship and their years as co-stars on Maude. About her relationship with Arthur, Barbeau said in a 2018 interview with Dread Central:
"I was doing an interview for this one-woman show that I am doing and the interviewer asked, 'What do people usually ask you,' and I said, 'They always want to know what it was like working with Bea.' She was fantastic and, you know, I realized years later how much I took it for granted because it was my first experience on television. I just assumed that everyone was as giving as she was, as professional as she was, that everyone who was doing a TV show showed up knowing their lines and showed up on time and was willing to say to the writers, 'I think this line was funnier if Adie had said it or Conrad had said it or Bill had said it.' I mean, she was just the best, she was the best, very funny. She was not Maude when she wasn't saying those lines. I don't know if I'd say she was quiet. She was a homebody. She had her sons, her dog and her cooking and she wasn't into the celebrity scene and she was a great lady. I loved her dearly and we had a great cast and they were my family for six years. I loved each of them and all of them and it was the best experience anyone could've had, being introduced to television like that!"

Barbeau was cast in numerous television films and series such as The Love Boat, Fantasy Island, Valentine Magic on Love Island and Battle of the Network Stars. In her autobiography, she claimed: "I actually thought CBS asked me to be on Battle of the Network Stars because they thought I was athletic. My husband clued me in: who cared if I won the race, as long as I bounced when I ran?"

The popularity of Barbeau's 1978 cheesecake poster confirmed her status as a sex symbol. Barbeau's popularity stemmed partly from what critic Joe Bob Briggs referred to as the "two enormous talents on that woman," and her typecasting as a "tough broad". Despite her initial success, she said at the time that she thought of Hollywood as a "flesh market" and that she would rather appear in films that "explore the human condition" and "deal with issues".

Barbeau's then-husband, director John Carpenter, cast her in his horror film, The Fog (1980), which was her first theatrical film appearance. The film was released on February 1, 1980, and was a theatrical success, grossing over $21 million in the United States alone, and establishing Barbeau as a genre film star. She subsequently appeared in a number of early-1980s horror and science fiction films, including Escape from New York (1981) (also from Carpenter), Creepshow (1982) and Swamp Thing (1982). Of her screen work with Carpenter, Barbeau has stated: "John is a great director. He knows what he wants and he knows how to get it. It's simple and it's easy [working with him]."

She also appeared in the Burt Reynolds comedy The Cannonball Run (1981), and as the shrewish wife of Rodney Dangerfield's character in Back to School (1986). Barbeau also starred in the comedy Cannibal Women in the Avocado Jungle of Death (1989).

1990s–present
In the 1990s, Barbeau mostly appeared in made-for-television films such as Scott Turow's The Burden of Proof (1992), as well as playing Oswald's mother on The Drew Carey Show and gaining new fame among animation fans as Catwoman on Batman: The Animated Series and Gotham Girls.

She also worked as a television talk show host and a weekly book reviewer for KABC talk radio in Los Angeles. In 1999, she guest starred in the Star Trek: Deep Space Nine episode "Inter Arma Enim Silent Leges" as Romulan Senator Kimara Cretak.

In 1998, Barbeau released her debut album as a folk singer, the self-titled Adrienne Barbeau. She starred in the cartoon series Totally Spies! doing the voice of villainess Helga Von Guggen in seasons 1, 2 and 4.

From 2003 to 2005, she starred on the HBO series Carnivàle. From March to May 2006, she starred as Judy Garland in the off-Broadway play The Property Known as Garland.

in 2007, Barbeau played a cameo role in Rob Zombie's Halloween, a "reimagining" of the 1978 film of the same name, written and directed by her first husband, John Carpenter. Her scene was cut from the theatrical version of the film but is included in the DVD version.

In 2009, Barbeau was cast as "The Cat Lady" in the family comedy The Dog Who Saved Christmas, as Scooter's mother in the 3D animated feature Fly Me to the Moon, and as a hospice patient in the love-story Reach for Me.

Also in 2009, Barbeau had guest spots in the first episode of Showtime's hit series Dexter (Season 4).

She voiced the Greek goddess Hera in the video game God of War III released for the PlayStation 3 in March 2010. In August 2010, she began a role on the long-running ABC daytime drama General Hospital. In 2012, she voiced UNSC scientist Dr. Tilson in the highly anticipated game Halo 4, released on the Xbox 360 in November 2012. She voiced characters in the 2015 Mad Max video game.

She appears in Argo (2012), playing the former wife of Alan Arkin's character.

Barbeau reprised her role as Catwoman in an animated remake of the third trailer for The Dark Knight Rises. This trailer was made to both celebrate the upcoming film as well as to promote Hub's ten episode marathon of Batman: The Animated Series.

In 2015, she assumed the role of Berthe in Pippin with the Broadway Touring Company of the renowned musical.

In 2021 Barbeau voiced the role of Queen Gehenna in the sci-fi musical audio series, The World to Come.

Personal life
In 1978, Barbeau met director John Carpenter on the set of his television film Someone's Watching Me! The couple wed on January 1, 1979, and lived in the Hollywood Hills section of Los Angeles, California although according to Barbeau remained "totally outside Hollywood's social circles." They remained together for five years, but separated shortly after the birth of their son John "Cody" Carpenter on May 7, 1984. The couple divorced later that year.

In 1991, Barbeau met actor/playwright/producer Billy Van Zandt, when she was cast in the West Coast premiere of his play Drop Dead! Van Zandt is the half-brother of musician/actor Steven Van Zandt. The couple wed in 1992. On March 17, 1997, at age 51, she gave birth to twin boys, Walker Steven and William Dalton Van Zandt, quipping that she was the only one on the maternity ward who was a member of AARP. The couple filed for divorce in 2018.

Filmography

Film

Television

Video games

Awards and nominations

Bibliography
Barbeau's autobiography There Are Worse Things I Could Do was published in 2006 by Carroll & Graf, rising to No. 11 on the Los Angeles Times bestsellers list. In July 2008, her first novel, Vampyres of Hollywood, was published by St Martin's Press. The novel was co-written by Michael Scott. The first sequel Love Bites was published in 2010, and the second, Make Me Dead was published in 2015.

See also

References

Sources

External links

 
 
 
 
 
 

1945 births
20th-century American actresses
21st-century American actresses
Actresses from Sacramento, California
American film actresses
American women singers
American folk singers
American musical theatre actresses
American people of Armenian descent
American people of French-Canadian descent
American people of German descent
American people of Irish descent
American soap opera actresses
American stage actresses
American television actresses
American video game actresses
American voice actresses
Del Mar High School alumni
Living people
Writers from Sacramento, California
Ethnic Armenian actresses